Jorge Brítez (born 2 February 1981) is a former Paraguayan footballer.

Career

Overview
Brítez played in the 1999 FIFA World Youth Championship in Nigeria as well as the 2001 FIFA World Youth Championship in Argentina. There, he was spotted by officials from a Spanish club and moved on to Europe but never fulfilled his potential there ultimately returning to his native Paraguay. Stints abroad in Israel and Portugal did not bear any fruit for Brítez' career for the second time so he returned to Paraguay. On 30 August 2010, he signed with the Superleague Greece club Panserraikos F.C. According to Paraguayan media, tired of the abuse and conflict between managers, coaches and players of Panserraikos F.C., Brítez terminated his contract with Panserraikos F.C. on 25 October 2010 and returned to Paraguay. Another website stated that Jorge Britez returned to Paraguay after annulling Panserraikos contract. Britez's agent Miguel Gonzalez Zelada explained that "With Britez we arrived at an agreement with the Greek club to cancel the contract, since he has not adapted, he does not like the treatment he received from the directors and the management. Now we are going to see where he can train, and by the end of the year find a club to play at,".
On 20 December 2010, Brítez revealed that his manager is in negotiations with Peruvian football club Juan Aurich. On 4 January 2011, Peruvian media announced that the player signed with Peruvian football club Juan Aurich.

Stint in Israel
After playing with the Paraguay national team, Jorge was spotted by scouts of Maccabi Haifa. He joined the squad along with Dante López but the two had trouble acclimating to life in Israel. Britez was expected to take on a defensive midfield role but Haifa officials later found out that that was not his natural position. He ended up finishing his only season in Israel and moving on to play club football in Portugal.

References

External links
  Profile and biography of Jorge Britez on Maccabi Haifa's official website

1981 births
Living people
People from Villarrica, Paraguay
Paraguayan footballers
Club Presidente Hayes footballers
Real Valladolid players
S.C. Braga players
Club Libertad footballers
Club Tacuary footballers
Maccabi Haifa F.C. players
Moreirense F.C. players
Club Olimpia footballers
Club Nacional de Football players
Cerro Porteño players
Club Rubio Ñu footballers
Panserraikos F.C. players
Deportivo Pereira footballers
Club Guaraní players
Sportivo Luqueño players
Sportivo Carapeguá footballers
Paraguay under-20 international footballers
Paraguay international footballers
Paraguayan Primera División players
La Liga players
Primeira Liga players
Israeli Premier League players
Uruguayan Primera División players
Paraguayan expatriate footballers
2004 Copa América players
Expatriate footballers in Spain
Expatriate footballers in Portugal
Expatriate footballers in Israel
Expatriate footballers in Uruguay
Expatriate footballers in Greece
Expatriate footballers in Colombia
Paraguayan expatriate sportspeople in Spain
Paraguayan expatriate sportspeople in Portugal
Paraguayan expatriate sportspeople in Israel
Paraguayan expatriate sportspeople in Uruguay
Paraguayan expatriate sportspeople in Greece
Paraguayan expatriate sportspeople in Colombia
Association football midfielders